Asperula orientalis, known as annual woodruff or oriental woodruff, is a species of flowering plant in the family Rubiaceae. It is found in Turkey, western Syria, Iraq, the Caucasus and Iran. It is often used as an ornamental plant in various regions and is reportedly naturalized in Oregon, North Dakota and the Czech Republic.

References

External links
photo of herbarium specimen at Missouri Botanical Garden, syntype of ''Asperula orientalis'
 World Checklist of Rubiaceae
Asperula orientalis
Outside Pride (Independence Oregon USA), Shake the Seed, Blue Woodruff Seeds
Annie's Annuals & Perennials (Richmond California USA), Blue Woodruff
Chiltern Seeds (Wallingford UK), Asperula orientalis, blue woodruff
Kings Seeds (Katikati, Bay of Plenty, New Zealand), Asperula sweet blue woodruff

orientalis
Flora of Turkey
Flora of Azerbaijan
Flora of Syria
Flora of Iran
Flora of Iraq
Flora of Armenia
Flora of the Czech Republic
Plants described in 1843
Taxa named by Pierre Edmond Boissier
Taxa named by Rudolph Friedrich Hohenacker